Mazenod Swallows FC is a Mosotho football club based in Mazenod that currently competes in the Lesotho Premier League. It is currently managed by former Lesotho international and Swallows player Teele Nts'onyana.

History  
The club was founded in 1931. Its biggest honour came in 2003 when it won the now-defunct Buddie Challenge Cup, the country's biggest cup competition at the time. It played in the nation's top-flight league from 2001 to 2011. It was champion of the Lesotho A–Division Southern Stream and promotion play-offs for the 2018/19 season, qualifying to return to the Lesotho Premier League for the 2018–19 campaign. Since returning to the top-flight Swallows FC has struggled financially and is one of the few teams in the league that does not pay players a salary.

Stadium 
Swallows FC plays its home matches at the Nyakosoba Ground in Nyakosoba, thirty three kilometers from Mazenod because the club's own venue does not meet Lesotho Football Association requirements for top-flight arenas.

Domestic history
Key

References

External links
Soccerway profile
Global Sports Archive profile

Football clubs in Lesotho
Lesotho Premier League clubs
Lesotho A–Division clubs
Association football clubs established in 1931